Boruszowice  is a village in the administrative district of Gmina Tworóg, within Tarnowskie Góry County, Silesian Voivodeship, in southern Poland.

The village has a population of 1,000.

References

Boruszowice